Philip Malcolm Waller Thody (21 March 1928 – 15 June 1999) was an English scholar of French literature who was Professor of French Literature at the University of Leeds from 1965 until 1993.

Early life and education
Thody was born in Lincoln in 1928 and educated locally.  After national service in the RAF, he read French at King's College London and subsequently lived in Paris for three years, writing a thesis on 'The Vogue of the American Novel in France since 1944', including a year as a lecteur at the Sorbonne.

Academic career
In 1956 Thody was appointed Assistant Lecturer, later Lecturer, at Queen's University Belfast. In 1965 he was appointed Professor of French Literature at the University of Leeds where he remained until his retirement in 1993.  He translated and edited work by Albert Camus and Lucien Goldmann, and wrote book-length studies of writers including Camus, Jean-Paul Sartre, Jean Genet, Marcel Proust, Aldous Huxley and Roland Barthes.

Thody launched a "total immersion language course" in French for the Civil Service College in 1972. In 25 years, 700 senior civil servants attended it.  Thody was also a member of the civil service final selection panel.

In 1982, he wrote the Thody Report, on improving Diplomatic Service language training.

Personal life
In 1954 he married Joy Woodin.  They had two sons and two daughters.

Death
Thody died in Leeds on 15 June 1999, aged 71.  He was survived by his wife and children.

Selected publications
 Albert Camus: a study of his work, 1957
 The Fifth French Republic: presidents, politics and personalities, 1960
 Jean-Paul Sartre, 1960
 Sartre: a biographical introduction, 1960
 Jean-Paul Sartre: a literary and political study, 1960
 (ed.) Notebooks, 1935-1942 by Albert Camus, 1963
 (tr.) The hidden God; a study of tragic vision in the Pensées of Pascal and the tragedies of Racine by Lucien Goldmann, 1964
 (ed.) Lyrical and critical essays by Albert Camus, 1967
 Jean Genet: a study of his novels and plays, 1968
 Huxley: a biographical introduction, 1973
 Roland Barthes: a conservative estimate, 1977
 Marcel Proust, 1980
 Le Franglais: forbidden English, forbidden American: law, politics, and language in contemporary France: a study in loan words and national identity, 1995
 Introducing Barthes, 1997
 Introducing Sartre, 1998

References

1928 births
1999 deaths
Alumni of King's College London
Academics of Queen's University Belfast
Academics of the University of Leeds
Scholars of French literature
English literary critics